George King (born 24 February 1995) is an Ireland international rugby league footballer who plays as a  and  for Hull Kingston Rovers in the Betfred Super League.

He previously played for Wakefield Trinity and the Warrington Wolves in the Super League, and on loan from Warrington at the North Wales Crusaders in Championship 1 and the Rochdale Hornets in the Betfred Championship.

Background
King was born in Huddersfield, West Yorkshire, England.

Playing career
George is the older brother of Toby King: they both played their amateur rugby league at Meltham All Blacks, and George additionally played for Siddal. They were spotted by the Wires’ Yorkshire scout Tommy Gleeson after both appeared for Huddersfield.

In 2016 he was called up to the Ireland squad for the 2017 Rugby League World Cup European Pool B qualifiers.

Warrington Wolves
King was promoted to the Warrington Wolves first team squad in 2014. His Super League début was against the Bradford Bulls in June 2014.

He played in the 2016 Challenge Cup Final defeat by Hull F.C. at Wembley Stadium.

He played in the 2016 Super League Grand Final defeat by the Wigan Warriors at Old Trafford.

He played in the 2018 Challenge Cup Final defeat by the Catalans Dragons at Wembley Stadium.

He played in the 2018 Super League Grand Final defeat by the Wigan Warriors at Old Trafford.

Hull Kingston Rovers
In September 2020 the club web site announced the signing of King from Wakefield Trinity
King played a total of 20 games for Hull KR in the 2021 Super League season including the club's 28-10 semi-final loss against the Catalans Dragons.

References

External links

Hull KR profile
Wakefield Trinity profile
Profile at warringtonwolves.com
SL profile
(archived by web.archive.org) Statistics at rlwc2017.com
Ireland profile

1995 births
Living people
English people of Irish descent
English rugby league players
Hull Kingston Rovers players
Ireland national rugby league team captains
Ireland national rugby league team players
North Wales Crusaders players
Rochdale Hornets players
Rugby league players from Huddersfield
Rugby league props
Wakefield Trinity players
Warrington Wolves players